The modern Rotokas alphabet is a Latin alphabet consisting of only 12 letters of the ISO basic Latin alphabet without diacritics:

It is the smallest alphabet in use today. The majority of the Rotokas people are literate in their language. In the Rotokas writing system the vowel letters have their IPA values, though they may be written double, aa, ee, ii, oo, uu, for long vowels. The consonant letters have the following values:

G:  or 
K: 
P: 
R: ,  or 
T:  (never occurs before I)
V:  or 

Here is a sample of written Rotokas:
Osireitoarei avukava iava ururupavira toupasiveira.
"The old woman's eyes are shut."

References 

Latin alphabets